The John S. Knight Center is a large convocation center located in Akron, Ohio, named after the newspaper publisher and editor John S. Knight.

The John S. Knight Center is the home of the Akron, Ohio Roller Derby team, the Rubber City Rollergirls.

References

External links
John S. Knight Center Official Website
Rubber City Rollergirls Official Website

Buildings and structures in Akron, Ohio
Tourist attractions in Akron, Ohio
Convention centers in Ohio
Sports venues in Akron, Ohio
Buildings and structures completed in 1994
1994 establishments in Ohio
Sports venues completed in 1994